Mstislav III Glebovich (before 1215/1220 – after October 18, 1239) was a Rus' prince (a member of the Rurik dynasty). He was probably prince of Rylsk (1212–1239/1241) and of Chernigov (1235–1239/1241). During his reign, the Tatars (the Mongols) invaded and pillaged the towns of the Principality of Chernigov.

His life

Early life
He was the son of Prince Gleb Svyatoslavich of Chernigov and Anastasia Ryurikovna, a daughter of Grand Prince Ryurik Rostislavich of Kiev. His father died between 1215 and 1220.

By 1225, Mstislav had already been second in seniority among the Olgovichi (the ruling dynasty of Chernigov), and therefore during the absence of his cousin, Mikhail Vsevolodovich, he commanded them. On April 6, 1231, he attended a snem (a meeting of some leading princes of Rus’ organized by Grand Prince Vladimir III Rurikovich) in Kiev, but the reasons for convoking the council are not given. It appears that his domain probably lay west of the Snov and Desna rivers.

Prince of Chernigov
Although the chronicles never tell us that he ruled Chernihiv, but his seniority merited him that post. Moreover, the evidence that the onus of defending the town fell on his shoulders supports this. 

In the autumn of 1239, the Tatar horde advanced against Chernihiv along the northern shore of the river Seym. Presumably, the invaders captured Hlukhiv, Kursk, Rylsk, and Putivl, and on reaching the river Desna, they advanced towards Chernihiv. When Mstislav heard that the Tatars were attacking the town, he came with his troops to confront them. The nomads used catapults that hurled stones the distance of a bowshot and a half. Mstislav barely escaped, but many of his men were killed. After Chernihiv fell on October 18, the Tatars pillaged the towns in the surrounding countryside.

Before departing from Chernihiv, the Tatars sent messengers to Kiev proposing peace, and they were pacified, we are told, with Mstislav. The chronicler probably made only a passing reference to his capitulation in an effort to underplay the nature of his commitments. He must have submitted to Batu Khan’s authority and agreed to campaign with him and to pay a tithe in everything.

In 1241, his cousin, Mikhail Vsevolodovich, who had returned from Masovia when the Tatars invaded his lands, gave Chernihiv to his own son, Rostislav Mikhailovich. Mikhail Vsevolodovich may have repudiated Mstislav because, contrary to his wishes, he had formed a pact with the enemy; or (although the chronicles fail to tell us) Mstislav may have died following his pact with the Tatars. The possibility of his demise is implied by the silence of the chronicles, which never mention him again.

Marriage and children
The name of his wife is not known.

Ancestors

Footnotes

Sources
Dimnik, Martin: The Dynasty of Chernigov - 1146-1246; Cambridge University Press, 2003, Cambridge; .

13th-century princes in Kievan Rus'
Olgovichi family
Princes of Chernigov
Eastern Orthodox monarchs